Everybody is the third studio album by American singer-songwriter Ingrid Michaelson. The album was released on August 25, 2009 on Cabin 24 Records. The first single from the album, "Maybe", was released on July 14, 2009.

Background
Originally, Michaelson wanted her album to sound close to "Once Was Love." Michaelson has stated that Everybody is "completely autobiographical, snapshots of my life." The main theme of the album, as stated by Michaelson, is  "everybody wants to be loved."

Track listing
All songs written and composed by Ingrid Michaelson.
 "Soldier" – 3:37
 "Everybody" – 3:29
 "Are We There Yet?" – 3:51
 "Sort Of" – 3:21
 "Incredible Love" – 3:53
 "The Chain" – 2:59
 "Mountain and the Sea" – 3:33
 "Men of Snow" – 4:33
 "So Long" – 3:13
 "Once Was Love" – 3:35
 "Locked Up" – 3:56
 "Maybe" – 3:13

CD bonus tracks
 "This is For"
 "Turn to Stone"

Personnel
 Luke Cissell – violin
 Seth Faulk – congas
 Mick Irwin – trumpet
 Elliot Jacobson – clacker, drums, bass drum, shaker, tambourine
 Ben Kalb – cello
 Chris Kuffner – bass guitar, double bass, electric guitar, mandolin
 Geoff Lewil – handclapping
 Todd Low – viola
 Saul Simon MacWilliams – handclapping 
 Oliver Manchon – violin
 Ingrid Michaelson – Fender Rhodes, acoustic guitar, organ, piano, ukulele, lead vocals, background vocals
 Bess Rogers – electric guitar
 Dan Romer – accordion, bass guitar, Chamberlin, drums, Fender Rhodes, glockenspiel, acoustic guitar, electric guitar, handclapping, keyboards, mellotron, organ, percussion, piano, programming, tambourine, ukeke, ukulele 
 Hiroko Taguchi – violin
 Brandon Walters – electric guitar

Charts

References

2009 albums
Ingrid Michaelson albums
Vertigo Records albums